Kulebaksky District was an administrative and municipal district (raion) in Nizhny Novgorod Oblast, Russia. It was located in the southwest of the oblast. Its administrative center was the town of Kulebaki. As of the 2010 Census, the total population of the district was 52,377, with the population of Kulebaki accounting for 68.3% of that number.

History
The district was established in 1929. Per Law #65-Z of May 12, 2015, the district was transformed into a town of oblast significance of Kulebaki. In a similar manner, Law #60-Z of May 8, 2015 abolished Kulebaksky Municipal District and transformed it into Kulebaki Urban Okrug.

Administrative and municipal divisions
As of May 2015, the district was administratively divided into one town of district significance (Kulebaki), two work settlements (Gremyachevo and Veletma), and four selsoviets (comprising twenty-four rural localities). Municipally, Kulebaksky Municipal District was divided into three urban settlements and four rural settlements.

Notable residents 

Yelena Afanasyeva (born 1967 in Kulebaki), athlete
Yakov Tryapitsyn (1897–1920), Soviet military and political figure

References

Notes

Sources

Districts of Nizhny Novgorod Oblast
States and territories established in 1929
States and territories disestablished in 2015
Kulebaki Urban Okrug